Cultureshock is a documentary TV series on A&E.

Format 
Each episode focuses on a moment that shocks American culture. The episodes are directed by different people every week.

Episodes

External links 
 
 Official site (archived)

References 

2010s American documentary television series
2018 American television series debuts
A&E (TV network) original programming
English-language television shows